Bilal Boutobba (born 29 August 1998) is a French professional footballer who plays as a right winger for Chamois Niortais.

Club career

Marseille
Born in Marseille and a youth product of Olympique de Marseille, Boutobba made his league debut on 14 December 2014 in a 1–0 away defeat against AS Monaco at the Stade Louis II, replacing Mario Lemina for the last six minutes of the game. In doing so, he became the youngest ever player to play an official match for Marseille, at the age of 16 years, 3 months and 15 days. The record was previously held by his teammate Jérémie Porsan-Clémenté, who was aged 16 years and 8 months on his debut earlier in the season.

Sevilla
On 18 June 2016, Boutobba confirmed that he would not be renewing his contract with Marseille and would instead be joining La Liga side Sevilla on a free transfer. On 7 July he joined them on a four-year deal, initially assigned to their reserve side. Boutobba made his debut in Segunda División on 10 September, replacing David Carmona for the final seven minutes of a 1–0 loss at CD Lugo.

On 31 August 2018, Boutobba terminated his contract with Sevilla.

Montpellier
On 21 September 2018, Boutobba returned to Ligue 1 with Montpellier Montpellier HSC on an undisclosed contract. He was assigned to their reserve team in Championnat National 3. He made his first-team debut on 24 February 2019, replacing Nicolas Cozza after an hour of a 4–2 home loss to Stade de Reims, and made one more appearance off the bench over the season.

Niort
In August 2020, out of contract at Montpellier, Boutobba signed a three-year deal at Chamois Niortais F.C. in Ligue 2. He scored his first professional league goal on 7 November to open a 4–3 win at FC Sochaux-Montbéliard that put his team in first place.

International career
Boutobba was born in France and is of Algerian descent. Boutobba made his debut for France under-17 on 25 October 2014 in a European qualifier at Pafiako Stadium in Paphos, Cyprus, playing the entirety of a 3–0 win over Macedonia.  In the opening match of the Elite Round on 20 March 2015, he netted the only goal in the first minute of the second half to defeat Israel. He was part of the French squad which won the finals in Bulgaria, netting in a 5–0 win over Scotland in the first group game.

Later in the year, he went with the team to the FIFA U-17 World Cup, forcing a James McGarry own goal and scoring in a 6–1 rout of New Zealand in the opening group game in Puerto Montt. Three days later, with a third-minute goal, he opened a 4–3 win over Paraguay. In the last 16, he scored in the penalty shootout as France were eliminated by Costa Rica after a goalless draw.

Career statistics

Honours
France
UEFA European Under-17 Championship: 2015

References

External links
 

Montpellier HSC profile

1998 births
Living people
Footballers from Marseille
French footballers
Association football midfielders
Ligue 1 players
Ligue 2 players
Championnat National 2 players
Championnat National 3 players
Olympique de Marseille players
Segunda División players
Sevilla Atlético players
Montpellier HSC players
Chamois Niortais F.C. players
France youth international footballers
French sportspeople of Algerian descent
French expatriate footballers
Expatriate footballers in Spain
French expatriate sportspeople in Spain